Feather flowers are artificial flowers created using feathers that are dyed, cut and shaped to resemble petals. Some artists are able to create very realistic looking flowers and leaves using feathers.

History
The art of creating feather flowers was mentioned as early as 1873 in a book called Art Recreations published by Shepard and Gill in Boston.

Mythology
The name of Xochiquetzal, the Aztec god of beauty, sexual love, and household arts, is translated from Nahuatl as "Precious Feather Flower".

See also
 Dinardi, stage magician famous for his performances with feather flowers

References

External links
 Meerreeng-an Here Is My Country - Feather flowers from Culture Victoria

Decorative arts
Indigenous culture
Featherwork
Floristry